Cellulomonas carbonis is a Gram-positive, aerobic, rod-shaped and motile bacterium from the genus Cellulomonas which has been isolated from soil from a coal mine in Tianjin, China.

References

 

Micrococcales
Bacteria described in 2012